Broken Bow Municipal Airport , also known as Keith Glaze Field, is a public use airport located two nautical miles (4 km) north of the central business district of Broken Bow, a city in Custer County, Nebraska, United States. It is owned by the Broken Bow Airport Authority. This airport is included in the National Plan of Integrated Airport Systems for 2011–2015, which categorized it as a general aviation facility.

Facilities and aircraft 
Broken Bow Municipal Airport covers an area of 181 acres (73 ha) at an elevation of 2,547 feet (776 m) above mean sea level. It has one runway designated 14/32 with a concrete surface measuring 4,203 by 75 feet (1,281 x 23 m).

For the 12-month period ending June 29, 2011, the airport had 10,830 aircraft operations, an average of 29 per day: 97% general aviation, 2% air taxi, and <1% military. At that time there were 13 aircraft based at this airport: 85% single-engine and 15% multi-engine.

References

External links 
 Airport page from the Nebraska Department of Aeronautics
 

Airports in Nebraska
Buildings and structures in Custer County, Nebraska